The Metaphysics of Quality (MOQ) is a theory of reality introduced in Robert M. Pirsig's novel, Zen and the Art of Motorcycle Maintenance (1974) and expanded in Lila: An Inquiry into Morals (1991). 

Robert M. Pirsig
Fictional philosophies